Roelof Peter van Laar (born 19 May 1981) is a Dutch politician. As a member of the Labour Party (Partij van de Arbeid) he was an MP between 14 May 2013 and 23 March 2017. At first he temporarily replaced Lea Bouwmeester who was on maternity leave. From 2006 to 2010 and from 2011 to 2012, he was a member of the municipal council of Leiden.

From 2008 to 2013 he was director of a foundation involving stopping child sexual abuse. He was also co-founder of this foundation.

Van Laar studied political science at Leiden University and is studying for an MBA at Webster University.

In 2015 there were reservations about his policy because he is not asking critical questions about the output of development aid.

References

External links 
 

1981 births
21st-century Dutch politicians
Dutch activists
Labour Party (Netherlands) politicians
Leiden University alumni
Living people
Members of the House of Representatives (Netherlands)
Municipal councillors of Leiden
People from Lansingerland
People from Leiden
Webster University alumni